The 2014–15 season was Dunfermline Athletic's second season in the Scottish League One, having been relegated from the Scottish First Division at the end of the 2012–13 season. Dunfermline Athletic also competed in the Challenge Cup, League Cup and the Scottish Cup.

Results & fixtures

Pre-season

Scottish League One

Scottish Challenge Cup

Scottish League Cup

Scottish Cup

Fife Cup

Player statistics

Captains

Squad
Last updated 23 July 2016

|-

|colspan="14"|Players who appeared for Dunfermline Athletic but left during the season:

|}

Clean sheets
{| class="wikitable" style="font-size: 95%; text-align: center;"
|-
!width=15|
!width=15|
!width=150|Name
!width=80|Total
!width=80|Scottish League One
!width=80|Scottish Cup
!width=80|Scottish League Cup
!width=80|Scottish Challenge Cup
|-
|GK
|
|Ryan Scully
|12
|11
|0
|0
|1
|-
|GK
|
|Ryan Goodfellow
|1
|1
|0
|0
|0
|-
|GK
|
|Jamie Wilson
|0
|0
|0
|0
|0
|-
|
|
! Totals !! 13 !! 12 !! 0 !! 0 !! 1

Goalscorers

Disciplinary record

Club statistics

League table

Results by round

Awards

Transfers

Players in

Players out

Loan in

Loans out

References

Dunfermline Athletic F.C. seasons
Dunfermline Athletic